Gideon Lee (April 27, 1778August 21, 1841) was an American politician who was the 60th Mayor of New York City from 1833 to 1834, and United States Representative from New York for one term from 1835 to 1837.

Early life
Lee was born in Amherst, Massachusetts on April 27, 1778 and attended the common schools there. He was a son of Gideon Lee (1747–1811) and Lucy ( Ward) Lee (1746–1817).

The first known member of the Lee family was John "Leigh" of an ancient and honorable family of Burton street, London, England. He was born about the year 1600, came to New England, and settled at Agawam (now Ipswich), Essex County, Massachusetts, in 1635. In 1677 his sons agreed to change the spelling of the family name from "Leigh" to "Lee." Gideon belonged to the sixth generation of this family.

Career
He became a shoemaker in Worthington, Massachusetts.  He moved first to New York City and then to Georgia, where he was in the mercantile business, of the old firm of "Gideon Lee, Shepard Knapp and Charles M. Leupp." He returned to New York in 1807 and engaged in the leather business.

He served as member of the New York State Assembly in 1823, and as alderman from 1828 to 1830. He was Mayor of New York from 1833 to 1834, but declined to be a candidate for reelection.

Lee was elected as a Jacksonian to the 24th United States Congress to fill the vacancy caused by the resignation of Campbell P. White and served from November 4, 1835, to March 3, 1837.  He then retired and moved to Seneca Lake in Geneva, New York.

He was a presidential elector on the Whig ticket in 1840, voting for William Henry Harrison and John Tyler.

Personal life
On April 28, 1823, Lee was married to Isabella Williamson (1800–1870), who was the daughter of the Rev. David Williamson, a minister of the Church of Scotland. Together, they were the parents of:

 Gideon Lee III (1824–1894), who married Floride Elizabeth Clemson, a daughter of Thomas Green Clemson and Anna Maria Calhoun Clemson (a daughter of U.S. Vice President John C. Calhoun). After her death, he married Ella Frances Lorton (1844–1921), a daughter of John S. Lorton.

Lee died on August 21, 1841 in Geneva, New York. He was buried at the Washington Street Cemetery in Geneva, New York.

References

External links

Mayors of New York City
1778 births
1841 deaths
Members of the New York State Assembly
Politicians from Amherst, Massachusetts
Politicians from Geneva, New York
1840 United States presidential electors
Jacksonian members of the United States House of Representatives from New York (state)
19th-century American politicians
New York (state) Whigs
Members of the United States House of Representatives from New York (state)
Shoemakers